"Iron John" (AKA "Iron Hans" or "Der Eisenhans") is a German fairy tale found in the collections of the Brothers Grimm, tale number 136, about a wild iron-skinned man and a prince. The original German title is Eisenhans, a compound of Eisen "iron" and Hans (like English John, a common short form of the personal name Johannes). It represents Aarne–Thompson type 502, "The wild man as a helper".

Most people see the story as a parable about a boy maturing into adulthood.  The story also became the basis for the book Iron John: A Book About Men by Robert Bly which spawned the mythopoetic men's movement in the early 1990s after spending 62 weeks on The New York Times Best Seller list.

Origin
According to the Brothers Grimm, the source of Eisern Hans, in their compilation, was tale nr. 17 from Friedmund von Arnim's book.

Synopsis

A King sends a huntsman into a forest nearby and the huntsman never returns. The King sends more men into the forest where they each meet with the same fate. The King sends all his remaining huntsmen out as a group, but again, none return. The king proclaims the woods as dangerous and off-limits to all.

Some years later, a wandering explorer accompanied by a dog hears of these dangerous woods and asks permission to hunt in the forest, claiming that he might be able to discover the fate of the other hunters. The man and his dog are allowed to enter. As they come to a lake in the middle of the forest, the dog is dragged under water by a giant arm. The hunter returns to the forest the next day with a group of men to empty the lake. They find a naked man with iron-like skin and long shaggy hair all over his body. They capture him and he is locked in a cage in the courtyard as a curiosity. The king declares that no one is allowed to set the wild man free or they will face the penalty of death.

Years later, the young prince is playing with a ball in the courtyard. He accidentally rolls it into the cage where the wild iron-skinned man picks it up and will only return it if he is set free. He states further that the only key to the cage is hidden beneath the queen's pillow.

Though the prince hesitates, he eventually builds up the courage to sneak into his mother's room and steal the key. He releases the wild iron-skinned man who reveals his name to be Iron John (or Iron Hans depending on the translation). The prince fears he will be killed for setting Iron John free, so Iron John agrees to take the prince with him into the forest.

Iron John is a powerful being and has many treasures that he guards. He sets the prince to watch over his well, but warns him not to let anything touch it or fall in because it will turn instantly to gold. The prince obeys at first, but begins to play in the well eventually turning all his hair into gold. Disappointed in the boy's failure, Iron John sends him away to experience poverty and struggle. Iron John also tells the prince that if he ever needs anything, simply to call the name of Iron John three times.

The prince travels to a distant land and offers his services to its king. Since he is ashamed of his golden hair, he refuses to remove his cap before its king and is sent to assist the gardener.

When war comes to the kingdom, the prince sees his chance to make a name for himself. He calls upon Iron John who gives him a horse, armor, and a legion of iron warriors to fight alongside him. The prince successfully defends his new homeland, but returns all that he borrowed to Iron John before returning to his former position.

In celebration, the king announces a banquet and offers his daughter's hand in marriage to any one of the knights who can catch a golden apple that will be thrown into their midst. The king hopes that the mysterious knight who saved the kingdom will show himself for such a prize. Again the prince asks Iron John for help, and again Iron John disguises the prince as the mysterious knight. Though the prince catches the golden apple and escapes, and does so again on two more occasions, he is eventually found.

The prince is returned to his former station, marries the princess, and is happily reunited with his parents. Iron John too comes to the wedding. This time, he is seen without the shaggy hair or iron skin that made him frightening. Iron John reveals he was under enchantment until he found someone worthy and pure of heart to set him free from the enchantment.

Analysis

Tale type
The tale is classified in the international Aarne-Thompson-Uther Index as type ATU 502, "The Wild Man as Helper".

The oldest variant to be preserved is the Italian Guerrino and the Savage Man. In chivalric romance the motif appears in recognizable if rationalized form in Roswall and Lillian.

Related tales
A more widespread variant, found in Europe, Asia, and Africa, opens with the prince for some reason being the servant of an evil being, where he gains the same gifts, and the tale proceeds as in this variant; one such tale is The Magician's Horse. Native American variants of this type were assumed by Stith Thompson to have originated from French-Canadian sources. These tales are classified in the Aarne-Thompson-Uther Index as ATU 314, "The Goldener": a youth with golden hair works as the king's gardener. 
 
Another closely related tale is the former tale type AT 532, "I Don't Know" or Neznaiko (a sapient horse instructs the hero to play dumb). The former type happens in Hungarian tale Nemtutka and Russian tale Story of Ivan, the Peasant's Son.

These three tale types (ATU 502, ATU 314 and AaTh 532), which refer to a male protagonist expelled from home, are said to be "widespread in Europe".

Variants
Tale type ATU 502 is known throughout Europe, in such variants as The Hairy Man. The tale type is said to be common in Russian and Ukraine, but "disseminated" in Western Europe. The type can also be found in India, Indonesia and Turkey.

Slavic
The tale type is also reported in the East Slavic Folktale Classification as type SUS 502, : the prince releases a supernatural prisoner his father captured, and is expelled from home; he reaches another kingdom and, through heroics, gets to marry a princess.

Germany
Germanist  collected another German variant, from Gutenberg, titled Der eiserne Mann ("The Iron Man").

Folklorist Franz Xaver von Schönwerth collected in the 19th century a Bavarian variant titled König Goldhaar ("King Goldenlocks"). In this tale, a king has a golden-haired son. One day, the king captures a wild man and brings it home in a cage. The young prince accidentally tosses his ball inside the cage, which the wild man promises to return if the boy releases him. The prince fulfills his promise, to the king's anger, who orders his son execution. However, the king's servants spare the boy and bring the king a poor shepherd's little finger as proof of his deed. The prince changes clothes with the shepherd and wanders off to another kingdom, where he finds work as the royal gardener's assistant. The prince, in his work as a gardener, arranges bouquets for the princesses, and ties a strand of his golden hair to the youngest's. Some time later, the king announces that he shall marry his elder daughter to the one who she gives her bouquet of flowers. The elder marries a prince, and so does the middle one. As for the youngest, she withholds hers until the gardener's assistat passes by her. She then gives the youth her bouquet, they marry and she moves out to his hut. Later, the king falls ill, and only the apples of Paradise can cure him. The gardener's assistant goes to the woods and meets the wild man again, who gives King Goldenlocks a club and orders him to strike a rock: a passage to a ush garden opens for King Goldenlocks to fetch the apples and rush out of the garden. It happens thus, and King Goldenlocks, the apples in his pocket, goes to a tavern and meets his brothers-in-law, who do not recognize him. King Goldenlocks agrees to let them have the apples, as long as they agree to be marked on their backs with the gallows. Next, the king is still sick, and needs snake's milk. King Goldenlocks follows the wild man's instructions again and gets the snake's milk; he then goes to meet his brothers-in-law again, who take the snake's milk in exchange for marking their backs again. Lastly, war breaks out, and the king sends his sons-in-law to protect the kingdom. King Goldenlocks meets the wild man again, who furnishes him with armour, weapons and a horse for him to join the battle. After three campaigns, King Goldenlocks, as a mysterious knights, receives an injury in his feet, which the king, his father-in-law, dresses with a handkerchief. Back to the castle, the king summons everyone for a banquet, and goes to the gardener's assistant hut to invite him in person. Once there, he sees his injured foot, and realizes the gardener's assistant was the knight at the battlefield. The tale was classified as both type ATU 502, "The Wild Man", and ATU 314, "Goldener".

Adaptations
 A literary version exists with the name The Forest Man, where the Wild Man-like character is named "Forest Man".
 Iron John was featured in Grimm's Fairy Tale Classics under its Iron Hans alias with Iron Hans voiced by Richard Epcar in the English dub.
 The story is featured as an episode of American McGee's Grimm, in which the tale is twisted into a Terminator-like setting.
 An episode from the fourth season of Grimm titled "Iron Hans" is loosely based on the story, and the episode "Cat and Mouse", from the first season, uses a line from it as an opening quote.
 The Iron John tale appears in Harry Harrison's The Stainless Steel Rat Sings The Blues (1994) as an allegory for children coming of age.
 Anne Sexton wrote an adaptation as a poem called "Iron Hans" in her collection Transformations (1971), a book in which she re-envisions sixteen of the Grimm's Fairy tales.
 Alphaville's 1994 song Iron John starts with a sketchy retelling of the first half of the story. The rest is about an opportunistic career in an unspecified profession in a more modern setting.
 Iron John appears in the 2015 American superhero film Avengers Grimm, portrayed by Lou Ferrigno.

Legacy
In 1991, Robert Bly analyzed the story in Iron John: A Book About Men. Bly's reading analyzes the story for lessons about masculinity applicable to 20th-century men, and became a major work of the mythopoetic men's movement.

See also

 Enkidu – A Sumerian wild man
 Feral child
 The Gold-bearded Man
 The Hairy Man - A similar story.
 Făt-Frumos with the Golden Hair

References

Footnotes

Further reading
 Kuhn, Hans. "Von Eisen und Gold und hilfreichen Pferden: Der Eisenhans und die Goldener Märchen". In: Kupfer Silber Gold - Sonne Mond Sterne: 4. Interdisziplinäres Symposion. Luzern, 18. bis 20. Juni 2004. Christine Altmann-Glaser (Hrsg.), mit Beiträgen von Otto Betz, Katalin Horn, Brigitte Jacobs, Hans Kuhn und Daniel Schlup. SMG, 2004. pp. 33-48. . (In German)

External links

 Iron Hans
 Der Eisenhans (German original)

Grimms' Fairy Tales
German folklore
German fairy tales
ATU 500-559